Pablo Logro, also known as Boy Logro or Chef Boy (born June 29, 1954), is a Filipino celebrity chef known for his cooking shows, Idol sa Kusina and Chef Boy Logro: Kusina Master.

Early and personal life
Logro was born into a fishing family in Davao City in the Philippines; he is the second son in a brood of eight.

Logro first worked in Cagayan de Oro for 2 years, before becoming a member of the service crew of several Jollibee restaurants in Manila. He later became a sous chef at Qaboos bin Said al Said's Al Alam Palace which took him to international trips, in turn exposing Logro to international cuisines. He was also able to complete culinary training in Italy, Switzerland, Spain and the United Kingdom.

Logro became an executive chef at the Manila Diamond Hotel. His Favorite lines in cooking are Ping, ping, ping! and Yum, yum, yum!.

Career
Logro was first known as being a presenter of the daytime cooking show Chef Boy Logro: Kusina Master. Logro owns the Chef Logro's Institute of Culinary and Kitchen Services.

In 2013, Logro appeared in the film The Fighting Chefs, marking his first action film role.

Logro also hosts another cooking show Idol sa Kusina which airs on Channel 27, GMA News TV.

Filmography

Television

Film

See also
GMA Network

References

External links

1954 births
Living people
Filipino chefs
People from Biliran
GMA Network personalities
Filipino television chefs